Brennus (or Brennos) was a chieftain of the Senones. He defeated the Romans at the Battle of the Allia (ca 390 BC). Later that year, he led an army of Cisalpine Gauls in their attack on Rome and captured most of the city, holding it for several months. Brennus' sack of Rome was the only time in 800 years the city was occupied by a non-Roman army before the fall of the city to the Visigoths in 410 AD.

Background
The Senones were a Gaulish tribe originating from the part of France at present known as Seine-et-Marne, Loiret, and Yonne, who had expanded to occupy northern Italy. At around 400 BC, a branch of the Senones made their way over the Alps and, having driven out the Umbrians, settled on the east coast of Italy from Ariminum to Ancona, in the so-called Ager Gallicus, and founded the town of Sena Gallica (current Senigallia), which became their capital.

In 391 BC, they invaded Etruria and besieged Clusium. The Clusines appealed to Rome. Quintus Fabius Ambustus and his two brothers were sent to negotiate with the Gauls. They allegedly broke their oath of neutrality by participating in hostilities outside of Clusium. Livy and Plutarch say that the Senones marched to Rome to exact retribution for this.

It is possible that the entire story of the events at Clusium is fiction, as Clusium had no real reason to appeal to Rome for help, and the Gauls needed no real provocation to sack Rome. The story, it is hypothesized, exists to provide an explanation for an otherwise unmotivated attack on Rome, and to depict Rome as a bulwark of Italy against the Gauls. Alternately, it has been theorized that Brennus was working in concert with Dionysius of Syracuse, who sought to control all of Sicily. Rome had strong allegiances with Messana, a small city state in north east Sicily, which Dionysius wanted to control. Rome's army being pinned down by Brennus' efforts would assist Dionysius's campaign.

Sack of Rome

In the Battle of the Allia, Brennus defeated the Romans and entered the city itself. The Senones captured the entire city of Rome except for the Capitoline Hill, which was successfully held against them. According to legend Marcus Manlius Capitolinus was alerted to the Gallic attack by the sacred geese of Juno. However, seeing their city devastated, the Romans attempted to buy their salvation from Brennus. The Romans agreed to pay one thousand pounds weight of gold. According to Livy, during a dispute over the weights used to measure the gold (the Gauls had brought their own, heavier-than-standard), Brennus threw his sword onto the scales and uttered the famous words "Vae victis!", which translates to "woe to the conquered!".

Defeat
One version of the story states that the argument about the weights had so delayed matters that the exiled dictator Marcus Furius Camillus had extra time to muster an army, return to Rome and expel the Gauls, saving both the city and the treasury, and telling Brennus, "Non auro, sed ferro, recuperanda est patria", which translates to "not by gold, but by iron, is the nation to be recovered". According to Plutarch, following initial combat through Rome's streets, the Gauls were first ejected from the city, then utterly annihilated in a regular engagement eight miles outside of town on the road to Gabbi. Camillus was hailed by his troops as another Romulus, father of his country 'Pater Patriae' and second founder of Rome.

Livy says that the Senones besieging the Capitoline Hill were afflicted with an illness and thus were in a weakened state when they took the ransom for Rome. This is plausible as dysentery and other sanitation issues have incapacitated and killed large numbers of combat soldiers up until and including modern times.

Silius Italicus claims that Hannibal's Boii cavalrymen were led by a descendant of Brennus named Crixus, who fell in the Battle of Ticinus.

In culture
 Geoffrey of Monmouth's Historia Regum Britanniae depicts Brennus under the name Brennius.
A famous depiction is the academic painting Le Brenn et sa part de butin (1893) by Paul Jamin that shows Brennus viewing his share of spoils (predominantly naked captive women) after the looting of Rome.
 The ghost of Brennus appears to support the Britons fighting Julius Caesar in the Jacobean era play Fuimus Troes.
 Brennus was played by Gordon Mitchell in the 1963 film Brennus, Enemy of Rome.
 Brennus and the sack of Rome by the Senones feature in Steven Saylor's historical novel Roma (2007)
 Brennus is a playable leader of the "Celts" faction in the 2001 video game expansion Civilization III: Play the World.

References

Primary sources
Livy, Ab Urbe Condita 5.34-49
Diodorus Siculus, Library 14.113-117
Plutarch, Camillus 15-30
Polybius, Histories 2.18
Dionysius of Halicarnassus, Roman Antiquities 13.6-12

5th-century BC births
Celtic warriors
Celts
Gaulish rulers
4th-century BC rulers
Year of death unknown